

List of countries

References

Southern Africa